State Route 363 (SR 363) is a short north–south state highway located in west-central Ohio.

Created in the middle of the 1930s, this short highway, which exists in both Shelby and Auglaize counties, provides access from SR 119 to a small community of cottages situated on a peninsula that juts out from the north side of Lake Loramie.

Route description
Around 490 vehicles use the road in Auglaize County on average every year, and 410 vehicles in Shelby County.

The route begins on a peninsula that juts out from the north shore of Lake Loramie in Shelby County's McLean Township, at a transition from Lotus Road, a street that continues for a short distance further onto the peninsula before dead ending. This peninsula is populated by a number of cottages. SR 363 traverses northeasterly through this community of cottages before turning north and heading into more rural territory. Bounded by farmland on the west side and woods on the east side, SR 363 intersects F and K Road, then crosses into Auglaize County's Jackson Township. At this point, the highway is now bordered by woods on the west and a pair of homes on the east, before entering fully into a landscape of open farmland. SR 363 passes a few homes prior to coming to its endpoint at a T-intersection with SR 119.

History
This two-county spur route was first designated in 1934 along the routing that it occupies today.  No major changes have taken place to this highway since its inception.

Major intersections

References

363
Transportation in Shelby County, Ohio
Transportation in Auglaize County, Ohio